Chlístovice is a municipality and village in Kutná Hora District in the Central Bohemian Region of the Czech Republic. It has about 800 inhabitants.

Administrative parts
Villages of Chroustkov, Kralice, Kraličky, Pivnisko, Švábínov, Svatý Jan t. Krsovice, Vernýřov, Všesoky, Žandov and Zdeslavice are administrative parts of Chlístovice.

Geography
It lies in the Upper Sázava Hills. The Vrchlice Stream flows along the eastern municipal border.

History
The first written mention of Chlístovice is from 1359.

Sights
The Church of Saint Andrew was originally a late Gothic cemetery church, rebuilt in the Baroque style at the beginning of the 18th century. It has an atypical tower with a wooden floor.

Near the Church of Saint Andrew is the ruin of Sion Castle, where the Hussite marshal Jan Roháč of Dubá made his last stand. It was built in 1420, but conquered already in 1437.

The Church of Saint John the Baptist is located in Svatý Jan t. Krsovice. It was built in the Baroque style in 1768–1772. It replaced a medieval church from the 13th century, which fell into disrepair and was therefore demolished.

On the Březina hill is a steel telecommunication tower, which also serves as an observation tower. There are 109 steps to the top.

References

External links

Villages in Kutná Hora District